Ptooff! is the debut studio album by English psychedelic rock band The Deviants. It was released by mail order only in June 1968 by record label Underground Impresarios and given a more public wide release on Sire Records in 1969.

Background 

Mick Farren and Russell Hunter had met 21-year-old millionaire Nigel Samuel who funded the £700 required for the recording of the album.

Release 

Ptooff!! was released in 1967 and 8,000 copies were sold on their own Impresario label via mail order through the UK underground press, such as Oz and International Times, before being picked up and released by Decca Records. The album is self-described on the inside cover as the deviants underground l.p.

The album was re-released in the mid-1980s by record label Psycho. The cover came in a six-panel fold-out with extensive notes, including a review by John Peel: "There is little that is not good, much that is excellent and the occasional flash of brilliance". There are two quotations in the cartoon drawing that fills three panels; one of them, "When the mode of the music changes, the walls of the city shake!!", is a quote from Tuli Kupferberg. Ptooff! was also re-issued on CD in 1992 by Drop Out Records.

Critical reception
Record Collector called the album "a compellingly itinerant squall of squat-crashing blues-psych-with- issues; the sound of caries and foetid flares."

Track listing

Personnel 

 Mick Farren – lead vocals, piano
 Sid Bishop – guitar, sitar
 Cord Rees – bass guitar, Spanish guitar
 Russell Hunter – drums, backing vocals
 Duncan Sanderson – vocals and mumbling
 Stephen Sparks – vocals and mumbling
 Jennifer Ashworth – vocals and mumbling
John Hammond - acoustic guitar

References

External links 

 

1967 debut albums
The Deviants (band) albums
Decca Records albums